The European Plain or Great European Plain is a plain in Europe and is a major feature of one of four major topographical units of Europe - the Central and Interior Lowlands. It is the largest mountain-free landform in Europe, although a number of highlands are identified within it.

Location
The Great European Plain stretches from the Pyrenees mountains and the French coast of the Bay of Biscay in the west to the Russian Ural Mountains in the east, including parts of Belgium, the Netherlands, Germany, Denmark, Poland, Lithuania, Latvia, Estonia, Finland, Belarus, Ukraine, Moldova, Romania, Bulgaria, and Kazakhstan. Most of the Great European Plain lies below 500 feet (152 metres) in elevation. Its shores are washed to the west and northwest by waters of the Atlantic basin, to the northeast - the Arctic Basin, and to the southeast - the Mediterranean Basin, including the Black Sea. To the south of the Middle European Plain stretch the central uplands and plateaus of Europe elevating to the peaks of the Alps, the Carpathian Mountains and the Balkan Mountains. To the northwest across the English Channel lie the British Isles and their lowlands, while across several straits north of the Jutland Peninsula lies the Central Swedish lowland in the Scandinavian Peninsula, which is part of the Fennoscandia ecoregion.

Most of the plain lies in the temperate broadleaf and mixed forest biome, while its far eastern portion extends into steppe of the ecoregion Eurasian Steppe.

Beside the Great European Plain, there are other, smaller European plains such as the Pannonian Basin or Mid-Danube Plain, which lies in Central Europe, Padana Plain which is located in the valley of the Po river, the Thracian Plain with Maritsa river, and lowlands of the British Isles.

The Great European Plain is divided into the North European Plain (Central/Middle European Plain) and the East European Plain. The subdivision is a historical one, rather than geomorphological: the Russian portion of the East European Plain is also known as the Russian Plain which covers almost all of European Russia.

In Western Europe, the plain is relatively narrow (mostly within  in width) in the northern part of Europe, but it broadens significantly toward its eastern part in Western Russia.

Hydrology
The plains are cut by many important rivers like the Loire, Rhine and Vistula in the west; the Northern Dvina and Daugava flowing northwards in East Europe and Russia and the Volga, the Don and the Dnieper flowing southwards of European Russia.

List of large bodies of water
 Baltic Sea
 Bay of Biscay
 Black Sea
 Caspian Sea
 English Channel
 Gulf of Bothnia
 North Sea
 Sea of Azov
 White Sea

Ecology
The European plain was once largely covered by forest, before human settlement and the resulting deforestation that occurred. One of the last (and largest) remnants of this primeval forest is Białowieża Forest, which straddles the border between Belarus and Poland. Now the European Plain is the most agriculturally productive region of Europe. Ecological regions include:
 Atlantic mixed forests
 Baltic mixed forests
 East European forest steppe
 Pontic–Caspian steppe

Geopolitical significance

The large uninterrupted flatland of the European Plain provides very little geographic protection against invasion. This has been a continuing problem for states whose heartlands are on the European Plain, especially Russia and France, the latter of which was invaded through the plain three times since 1870, two of which successfully occupied the country. Historically, the plains have been the site of numerous battles and invasions, as they offer relatively easy access to neighboring countries and provide an open space for armies to maneuver. It also play a major role in the European Union as a key region for trade and industry. The EU's Common Agricultural Policy, which regulates the agricultural production, is also heavily influenced by the plains. The plains are also a major center for the production of renewable energy. Additionally, the plains are also home to many of Europe's most important cultural and historical sites.

See also
 Geography of Europe

References

 
Plains of Europe
Physiographic divisions
Geopolitics